Emma Kristiina Terho  (born 17 December 1981) is a Finnish retired ice hockey defenseman and the current Chair of the IOC Athletes' Commission. She previously served as general manager of Kiekko-Espoo Naiset in the Naisten Liiga. At the 1998 Winter Olympics in Nagano she became the youngest Winter Olympian to medal for Finland, winning a bronze medal at the age of 16 years 54 days.

Playing career

Ohio State University 
Terho played college ice hockey with the Ohio State Buckeyes women's ice hockey program while attending Ohio State University (OSU) during 2000 to 2004. In the 2001–02 season she was the first women's ice hockey player from Ohio State to earn All-American honors when she was named to the 2001–02 Jofa/American Hockey Coaches Association (AHCA) Second Team All-American and was a top-10 finalist for the Patty Kazmaier Award.

On 11 October 2008, Terho became the first women's hockey player to have her Buckeye number retired. The retirement ceremony occurred prior to an Ohio State vs. Purdue University football game at Ohio Stadium, where Terho was recognized on the field at the 50-yard line. She was inducted into the Ohio State Athletics Hall of Fame on 25 September 2009.

Espoo Blues, 2004–2007 
In Finland she played with the Espoo Blues Naiset, with whom she won the Finnish Championship eight times (1999, 2000, 2005, 2007, 2009, 2013, 2014, and 2015). With the Espoo Blues she won three Finnish Championship bronze medals (1997, 1998, and 2006).

SKIF Nizhny Novgorod 
In the 2007–08 season Terho played in Nizhny Novgorod, Russia with SKIF of the Russian Women's Hockey League (RWHL). Three other Finnish players, forwards Kati Kovalainen, Karoliina Rantamäki, and Nora Tallus, also played for SKIF in that season. The team won the 2008 Russian Women's Hockey League Championship.

Espoo, 2008–2017 
Terho returned to the Espoo Blues after the 2007-08 season in Russia. The 2008-09 season was very successful, both personally and for the team. Terho set a career high for assists with 32 and ended the regular season with an impressive 34 points in just 19 games.

International play 
As a member of the Finnish national ice hockey team, Terho was a five-time Winter Olympian and two time Olympic bronze medalist. In the inaugural Olympic women's ice hockey tournament at the 1998 Olympics, she was the youngest player on the bronze medal winning Finnish team, at 16 years and 54 days. She served as Finland's captain in the women's ice hockey tournament at the 2010 Winter Olympics in Vancouver, at which she won her second Olympic bronze medal, and as an alternate captain in the women's ice hockey tournament at the 2014 Winter Olympics in Sochi.

Terho also represented Finland at eight IIHF Women's World Championships, winning bronze medals at the tournaments in 2000, 2004, 2008, and 2009, in addition to participating at the tournaments in 2001, 2005, 2007, and 2013. She was selected to the Media All-Star team at the 2008 tournament.

Sports administration 
Terho became involved in the administrative aspect of sport as a member of the Student Athlete Board during her junior and senior years at Ohio State University (2002–2004). In 2006, after graduating and returning to Finland to play in the Naisten SM-sarja, she became a member of the Finnish Olympic Committee. In 2011 as part of the IIHF Ambassador and Mentor Program (AMP) she became an Athlete Ambassador to Kazakhstan with the directive to use her experience at Olympic Games, World Championships, and other high level women's ice hockey programs to help build the women's game in her designated country. As her playing career wound down, Terho ramped up her involvement in Finnish sports administration and became an influential and important player in that sphere.

At the 2018 Winter Olympics, Terho was elected for an eight-year term as a member of the IOC Athletes' Commission, with the largest share of votes of all candidates put forward. The election also made her an International Olympic Committee Member. On 6 August 2021, at the 2020 Summer Olympics in Tokyo, Terho was elected as the new Chair of the IOC Athletes' Commission. She replaced outgoing Chair Kirsty Coventry, who had served as Chair since 2018 and had remained in role for an additional year beyond her eight-year term to help maintain the IOC Athletes’ Commission's work during the COVID-19 pandemic, following the postponement of the 2020 Olympic Games.

Administrative titles and roles 
 Member of the Board, Finnish Ice Hockey Association, 2014–present
 Member of the Finnish Advisory Board of Sport Ethics, 2015–present
 Chair of Finnish Olympic Committee Athletes’ Commission, 2016–2020; member, 2006–2016
 Member of the International Ice Hockey Federation (IIHF) Women's Committee, 2016–present
 Member of the International Olympic Committee (IOC), 2018–present
 Chair of the IOC Athletes' Commission, 2021–present; member, 2018–2021
 Member of the Coordination Commission for the XXIV Olympic Winter Games (Beijing 2022), 2018–2022
 Member of the Olympic Programme Commission, 2018–present
 Member of the Marketing Commission, 2020–2021
 Member of the Legal Affairs Commission, 2019–2021
 Member of the Olympic Solidarity Commission, 2022–present
 Member of the World Anti-Doping Agency (WADA) Foundation Board, 2018–present
 Member of the Executive Committee, 2021–present

Personal life
Terho was born on 17 December 1981 in Washington, D.C., where her father had been invited to survey and improve nuclear safety in the United States following the Three Mile Island accident in 1979.

Terho holds a Bachelor of Business Administration in Finance from Ohio State University (2004) and a Masters of Science in Economics from the Helsinki School of Economics at Aalto University (2013). She began her career in finance while still an active ice hockey player, serving as a fixed income trader for Pohjola Bank from 2006 to 2013. Beginning in 2014, Terho served as a product manager for fixed income products at OP-Pohjola Financial Group.

Her husband, Teemu Terho, also works in banking. They have two children, born in 2012 and 2014 respectively.

Career statistics

Regular season and playoffs

Club tournaments

International

Sources:

Awards and honours

Sources:

Records

NCAA 
Records valid through 2020–21 NCAA season.

Season
 2nd most power-play goals (17), 2000–01 season

Single-game
 Most power play goals (3), Ohio State vs. Wayne State on 2 March 2001 – tied for first with nine other players (Andie Anastos, Hilary Knight, Bridgette Prentiss, Bobbi Ross, Melanie Salatino, Jenny Schmidgall-Potter, Laura Slominski, Blayre Turnbull, Rebecca Vint)

WCHA 
Records stand through the 2019–20 WCHA season.

Career
 8th most goals by a defenceman (34) – tied with Kerry Weiland and Rachel Ramsey

Season
 Most power play goals (17), 2000–01 season
 3rd most goals by a defenceman (19), 2000–01 season
 10th most power play points (29), 2000–01 season – tied with Jenny Schmidgall-Potter (2002–03) and Jocelyne Lamoureux (2011–12, 2012–13)

Single-game
 Most power play goals (3), Ohio State vs. Wayne State on 2 March 2001 – tied for first with six other players: Brigette Lacquette, Nadine Muzerall, Bobby Ross, Melanie Salatino, Laura Slominski, and Blayre Turnbull

Ohio State Buckeyes 
Records valid through 2019–20 Ohio State Buckeyes season.

Career
 3rd most power-play goals (23) – tied with Erin Keys
 3rd most points by a defenseman (99) – tied with Jincy Dunne
 4th most power-play points (59) – tied with Laura McIntosh
 10th most assists (65)
Season
 Most power-play goals (17), 2000–01
 Most power-play points (29), 2000–01
 3rd most points by a defenseman (38), 2000–01 – tied with Amber Bowman (2006–07)
Single-game
 Most power play goals (3), Ohio State vs. Wayne State on 2 March 2001

References

External links 
 
 
 

1981 births
Living people
Aalto University alumni
Espoo Blues Naiset players
Finnish expatriate ice hockey players in Russia
Finnish expatriate ice hockey players in the United States
Finnish ice hockey administrators
Finnish women's ice hockey defencemen
Ice hockey people from Washington, D.C.
Ice hockey players at the 1998 Winter Olympics
Ice hockey players at the 2002 Winter Olympics
Ice hockey players at the 2006 Winter Olympics
Ice hockey players at the 2010 Winter Olympics
Ice hockey players at the 2014 Winter Olympics
International Olympic Committee members
Kiekko-Espoo Naiset players
Medalists at the 1998 Winter Olympics
Medalists at the 2010 Winter Olympics
Ohio State Buckeyes women's ice hockey players
Olympic bronze medalists for Finland
Olympic ice hockey players of Finland
Olympic medalists in ice hockey
HC SKIF players
Sportspeople from Espoo
Women ice hockey executives